Eshqabad-e Kohneh (also Romanized as ‘Eshqābād-e Kohneh; also known as ‘Eshqābād) is a village in Darbqazi Rural District, in the Central District of Nishapur County, Razavi Khorasan Province, Iran. At the 2006 census, its population was 34, in 13 families.

References 

Populated places in Nishapur County